Bahram Eynollahi (or Einollahi)  is an Iranian politician and ophthalmologist. He is professor of ophthalmology in cornea, refractive surgery, and anterior segment of the eye at Shahid Beheshti University of Medical Sciences, Tehran. He serves as minister of Health and Medical Education from 25 August 2021, where he replaced Saeed Namaki. 

Within the few days of his assignment as the minister of health the coverage of COVID-19 vaccine received to 50 millions doses, totally.

Among his responsibilities, he conferred with leaders of other countries to discuss cooperative agreements on health matters.

References

External links
Bahram Einollahi on PubMed

1958 births
Living people
People from Sarab, East Azerbaijan
Academic staff of Shahid Beheshti University of Medical Sciences
Iranian ophthalmologists
Isfahan University of Medical Sciences alumni
Health officials
20th-century Iranian physicians
21st-century Iranian physicians
Iranian medical researchers